Guadalajara–Yebes railway station (Spanish: Estación de Guadalajara–Yebes)  is a railway station near Guadalajara, Spain, on the Madrid–Barcelona high-speed rail line. A commercial service began in 2003 when the section between Madrid and Zaragoza opened.

Guadalajara has another station on the conventional line called Guadalajara railway station, which offers a variety of routes including a commuter service to Madrid.

The station has attracted criticism as it cost €11 million to build, but was only used by 78,000 passengers in 2016.

References

Madrid–Barcelona high-speed rail line
Railway stations in Castilla–La Mancha
Buildings and structures in Guadalajara, Spain